Honda has made two variations of a four-stroke, naturally-aspirated, V8 racing engines to compete in Formula One. Honda ultimately had to pull out of Formula One after 2008, due to the global financial crisis. The customer engines were used by both Honda and Super Aguri teams.

Complete Formula One results

As a constructor
(key)

 All 14 points scored by Honda V12 engines.

As an engine supplier
(key)

Grand Prix engine results
1 race win.
1 pole position.
4 podium finishes

References

RA
Formula One engines
Gasoline engines by model
V8 engines